The Köthen Solar Park is a photovoltaic power station in Köthen, Germany. It has a capacity of 45 megawatts (MW) and an expected annual electricity generation of 42 gigawatt-hours. The solar park was developed and built by RGE Energy.

In 2009, the project was the largest solar power plant in Saxony-Anhalt and the world's largest system using string inverters. The project is equipped with 205,000  solar module made of crystalline silicon by BP Solar. Total investment in the project was around €133 million. The solar park was connected to the grid in 2009. Payment was fixed to 35.49 Euro-cents per kilowatt-hour for 20 years.

References

Photovoltaic power stations in Germany
2008 establishments in Germany